Philodoria auromagnifica is a moth of the family Gracillariidae. It was first described by Lord Walsingham in 1907. It is endemic to the Hawaiian islands of Oahu, Molokai and Hawaii.

The larvae feed on Myrsine species. They mine the leaves of their host plant. The larvae emerge from the mines to pupate in oval cocoons on the surface of the leaves.

External links

Philodoria
Endemic moths of Hawaii
Taxa named by Thomas de Grey, 6th Baron Walsingham
Moths described in 1907